Persias Asmat or abbreviation of Persatuan sepakbola Indonesia Asmat is an Indonesian football club based in Asmat Regency, South Papua. Club played in Liga 3.

References

External links
Liga-Indonesia.co.id

Football clubs in South Papua
Football clubs in Indonesia